Adrienn Nyeste (born 14 December 1978) is a Hungarian gymnast. She competed at the 1996 Summer Olympics and the 2000 Summer Olympics.

References

External links
 

1978 births
Living people
Hungarian female artistic gymnasts
Olympic gymnasts of Hungary
Gymnasts at the 1996 Summer Olympics
Gymnasts at the 2000 Summer Olympics
Sportspeople from Békés County
Originators of elements in artistic gymnastics
20th-century Hungarian women
21st-century Hungarian women